Dynamic painting may refer to:
 Action painting
 Generative art which updates in real time